Bruceton can refer to:
 Bruceton, Tennessee, a town
 Bruceton, Pennsylvania, an unincorporated suburb of Pittsburgh
 Bruceton Subdivision, a railroad line in Tennessee

See also
 Bruceton Mills, West Virginia
 Bruceton analysis of explosives